Pierre Biehler is a French retired slalom canoeist who competed in the early-to-mid 1950s. He won two medals in the C-1 team event at the ICF Canoe Slalom World Championships with a silver in 1951 and a bronze in 1953.

References

French male canoeists
Possibly living people
Year of birth missing
Medalists at the ICF Canoe Slalom World Championships